WZDM (92.1 FM) is a radio station broadcasting an adult contemporary format. Licensed to Vincennes, Indiana, the station is owned by The Original Company, Inc.

References

External links
WZDM's website

ZDM